Aberdeen Hall is an independent, non-denominational, co-educational, university-preparatory school founded in 2004. Located in Kelowna, British Columbia, Canada, it delivers the British Columbia Ministry of Education curriculum from Preschool to Grade 12.

Facilities

Aberdeen Hall's only campus is located near the University of British Columbia's Okanagan campus and has an Early Learning Centre (housing Preschool to Kindergarten), a Junior Hall (housing grades 1–5) and a Senior Hall (housing grades 6–12) with a Great Hall common area.

Aberdeen Hall relies heavily on private fundraising to expand its campus and facilities. As of November 30, 2020 they are currently campaigning for a new gym and wellness centre to expand their on campus offerings.

References

External links

Boarding schools in British Columbia
Preparatory schools in British Columbia
Private schools in British Columbia
High schools in Kelowna
Elementary schools in Kelowna
Educational institutions established in 2004
2004 establishments in British Columbia